Byron Stingily is an American R&B and house-music singer born in Chicago, Illinois, known for his falsetto voice. He is now a part-time principal at a school in Chicago while still performing.

Career
Stingily had several hit records in the 1980s and 1990s as the lead singer of Ten City. As a solo artist, he had his biggest success on the US Billboard Hot Dance Club Play chart, where he hit No. 1 three times. In 1997 he spent a week in the top spot with "Get Up (Everybody)" where he sampled Sylvester's "Dance (Disco Heat)", then hit No. 1 again in 1998 with a remake of Sylvester's "You Make Me Feel (Mighty Real)", produced by Damien Mendis and Stuart Bradbury.

"That's the Way Love Is," a No. 1 dance hit in 1989 for Ten City, brought him to No. 1 again in 1999 when he re-recorded it on his own. Some of his recent singles have been released on the UK-based record label Defected Records.

In 2021, he teamed up with producer Marshall Jefferson to release "Be Free", the first single in 25 years to be credited to Stingily's house music group Ten City.

Discography

Albums

Singles

Personal life
Stingily is the father of visual artist and poet Diamond Stingily and professional athlete Byron, who played offensive tackle in the NFL for 5 years ending his career with the New York Giants in 2016.

See also
List of Billboard number-one dance club songs
List of artists who reached number one on the U.S. Dance Club Songs chart

References

External links
MySpace Page
Byron Stingily 2012 Audio Interview at Soulinterviews.com

Year of birth missing (living people)
Living people
21st-century African-American male singers
Columbia Records artists
Atlantic Records artists
American garage house musicians
American soul singers
American house musicians
American dance musicians
Singers from Chicago